Wilford Toll Bridge, locally referred to as the 'Halfpenny Bridge', is a tram, pedestrian and cycle bridge in Nottingham, England. It crosses the River Trent between the Meadows and Wilford. It originally opened as a toll bridge for general traffic in 1870, but was closed when declared unsafe in 1974. Following demolition of the central span, a narrower footbridge and cycleway was opened in 1980. The bridge was once again widened to accommodate an extension of the Nottingham Express Transit network in 2015.

Parts of the northern side of the bridge are  Grade II listed building, including the former toll house.

History

Wilford Ferry

Until the bridge opened a Wilford Ferry was in operation for some 400 years. This ferry was the scene of a disaster in 1784, when in the midst of a gale an overcrowded ferry boat capsized, and six unfortunate passengers were drowned.

Another fatal accident occurred on 10 January 1837 when John Oakley, a Wilford farmer, and two others used another boat which drifted downstream and capsized when it hit the ferry chain.

An act of parliament was obtained in 1862 for the construction of a bridge. The ferry service ended on 18 September 1864, when a temporary wooden footbridge was opened.

Wilford Toll Bridge
The toll bridge opened on 16 June 1870. It was built by Sir Robert Juckes Clifton, 9th Baronet, for the traffic for Clifton Colliery. The bridge was a cast-iron structure by Andrew Handyside of Derby.

The toll house was designed by the architect E.W. Hughes. It is built of red brick, ashlar dressing and steep hipped slate/lead roofs, and as of 2019 is used as a sandwich shop.

The bridge was owned by the Clifton family until Nottingham City Council took over responsibility for it in 1969. The piers have the Clifton arms on the inward facing walls.

After a structural assessment revealed that the bridge was in a poor condition, it was closed to traffic in 1974. The centre span was demolished and replaced by a narrower footbridge, of steel girders with an in-situ reinforced concrete deck slab, in 1980. The bridge was then used as a footpath and cycleway, with a gas main and cable services under the deck.

During 2014 & 2015 the bridge was enlarged as part of the works to construct Phase 2 of the Nottingham Express Transit system.

Table of tolls

On the toll house is a sign which reads:

Table of tolls to be taken under the Wilford Bridge Act 1862.  For every horse or other beast drawing any Coach or Stage Coach, Omnibus, Van, Caravan, Sociable, Berlin, Landau, Chaial, A-Vis, Barouche, Phaeton, Chaise Marine, Caleche, Carricle, Chair, Gig, Dog cart, Irish Car, whisky, Hearse, Litter, Chais or any little carriage 6D.  For every horse or other beast drawing any wagon, wain, cart or other carriage. 4D. For every horse or mule, laden or unladen not drawing 1½ D.  For every Ox, Cow, Bull or Neat cattle 1 penny; or for a score 6D.

See also
List of crossings of the River Trent

References

Bridges in Nottingham
Bridges across the River Trent
Bridges completed in 1870
Bridges completed in 1974
Former toll bridges in England
Nottingham Express Transit
Grade II listed bridges
Grade II listed buildings in Nottinghamshire
West Bridgford